The men's 5000 metres competition at the 2006 Asian Games in Doha, Qatar was held on 12 December 2006 at the Khalifa International Stadium.

Schedule
All times are Arabia Standard Time (UTC+03:00)

Records

Results 
Legend
DNS — Did not start

References

External links
Results

Athletics at the 2006 Asian Games
2006